Palmerston Airport, formerly , was a lightly used registered aerodrome, located  east of Palmerston, Ontario, Canada.

References

Defunct airports in Ontario